Kirk Pride was a cargo ship that operated in the Cayman Islands from 1947 to 1976. In January 1976, an approaching storm prompted authorities to move the ship to a different harbor. However, her engines malfunctioned and would not turn off when they were supposed to.  As a result, the ship was unable to stop in time before it struck the wall of the reef. The resulting breach in the hull led authorities to strive for days to keep her afloat, until the attempts failed and the ship was abandoned. Kirk Pride was abandoned when she sank, so there was no loss of life in the sinking.

The wreckage lay unnoticed until 1985, when it was discovered off the Cayman Wall. The wreck of Kirk Pride lies under 800 feet of water near the base of the Wall in George Town Harbor, Grand Cayman. Trapped by two pinnacles, one at the bow and another at the stern, it rolled down the 45–60° slope to the edge of the shelf. Underwater visibility is approximately 300 feet horizontally at this depth and twice that when looking upward.

The ship has interested divers following its sinking.  A brief film of the wreck can be viewed on the episode "Reefs and Wrecks" of the BBC television series Wild Caribbean, produced in 2008.  The name of the ship is visible at filming on the stern.

An expeditionary dive was conducted by S.U.C.C. in the early 2000 but due to an error in gas mixing, and the death of a diver, J.T. The dive was terminated, but the footage remains. The ship has since, dislodged and slipped over the shelf and descended to the ocean floor. No salvage attempts have been made to date.

External links
Kirk Pride

Shipwrecks in the Gulf of Mexico
Maritime incidents in 1976
1947 ships